The 2019 Elimination Chamber (known as No Escape in Germany) was the ninth Elimination Chamber professional wrestling pay-per-view and livestreaming event produced by WWE. It was held for wrestlers from the promotion's Raw, SmackDown, and 205 Live brand divisions. The event took place on February 17, 2019, at the Toyota Center in Houston, Texas.

Seven matches were contested at the event, including one on the Kickoff pre-show. In the main event, Daniel Bryan defeated AJ Styles, Samoa Joe, Kofi Kingston, Randy Orton, and Jeff Hardy in an Elimination Chamber match to retain SmackDown's WWE Championship. On the undercard, Finn Bálor defeated defending champion Bobby Lashley and Lio Rush in a 2-on-1 handicap match to win Raw's Intercontinental Championship, Ronda Rousey defeated Ruby Riott to retain the Raw Women's Championship, and in the opening bout, The Boss 'n' Hug Connection (Bayley and Sasha Banks) defeated Carmella and Naomi, Mandy Rose and Sonya Deville, Nia Jax and Tamina, The IIconics (Billie Kay and Peyton Royce), and The Riott Squad (Liv Morgan and Sarah Logan) in a women's tag team Elimination Chamber match to become the inaugural holders of the WWE Women's Tag Team Championship.

Production

Background
Elimination Chamber is a gimmick pay-per-view (PPV) and WWE Network event first produced by WWE in 2010. It has been held every year since, except in 2016, generally in February. The concept of the show is that one or two main event matches are contested inside the Elimination Chamber, either with championships or future opportunities at championships at stake. While the 2018 event was held exclusively for the Raw brand, the 2019 event featured wrestlers from Raw, SmackDown, and 205 Live, as following WrestleMania 34 in April 2018, WWE discontinued brand-exclusive pay-per-views. The 2019 event was the ninth event under the Elimination Chamber chronology and took place on February 17, 2019, at the Toyota Center in Houston, Texas.

In 2011 and since 2013, the show has been promoted as "No Escape" in Germany as it was feared that the name "Elimination Chamber" may remind people of the gas chambers used during the Holocaust.

Storylines

The card comprised seven matches, including one on the Kickoff pre-show. The matches resulted from scripted storylines, where wrestlers portrayed heroes, villains, or less distinguishable characters in scripted events that built tension and culminated in a wrestling match or series of matches. Results were predetermined by WWE's writers on the Raw, SmackDown, and 205 Live brands, with storylines produced on their weekly television shows, Monday Night Raw, SmackDown Live, and the cruiserweight-exclusive 205 Live.

On the December 24, 2018, episode of Raw, WWE Chairman Vince McMahon announced that a new WWE Women's Tag Team Championship would be introduced in 2019. On the January 14, 2019, episode of Raw, on her segment "A Moment of Bliss", Alexa Bliss unveiled the championship belts and revealed that the inaugural champions would be determined at Elimination Chamber in a tag team Elimination Chamber match, featuring three teams from Raw and SmackDown each, making the championship non-exclusive to either brand. Qualification matches to determine the three teams from Raw took place on the January 28 and February 4 episodes of Raw: the teams of Nia Jax and Tamina, The Riott Squad (represented by Liv Morgan and Sarah Logan), and The Boss 'n' Hug Connection (Bayley and Sasha Banks) each qualified by defeating the teams of Bliss and Mickie James, Natalya and Dana Brooke, and Alicia Fox and Nikki Cross, respectively. Due to its smaller roster, no qualification matches were held for SmackDown and instead, the teams of Sonya Deville and Mandy Rose, The IIconics (Billie Kay and Peyton Royce), and Naomi and Carmella all announced their participation. On the February 11 and February 12 episodes of Raw and SmackDown, triple threat tag team matches occurred between each brand's three respective tag teams to determine which two teams would start the Elimination Chamber match. Bayley and Rose were pinned in their respective matches, making Banks and Bayley, and Deville and Rose the first entrants in the chamber.

At the Royal Rumble, The Miz and Shane McMahon defeated The Bar (Cesaro and Sheamus) to win the SmackDown Tag Team Championship. On the following episode of SmackDown, The Usos (Jey Uso and Jimmy Uso) defeated The Bar, The New Day (represented by Big E and Kofi Kingston), and Heavy Machinery (Otis Dozovic and Tucker Knight) in a four-corners tag team elimination match to earn a championship match at Elimination Chamber.

At the Royal Rumble, Daniel Bryan defeated AJ Styles to retain the WWE Championship with help from the returning Rowan. On the following episode of SmackDown, Bryan, along with Rowan, disposed the standard leather-bound title belt with metal plates in a garbage can and introduced a new custom belt made from hemp and wood. Styles then confronted Bryan and Rowan, followed by Randy Orton, Samoa Joe, Jeff Hardy, and Mustafa Ali. After an ensuing brawl, WWE Chief Operating Officer Triple H scheduled Bryan to defend the championship against the five in an Elimination Chamber match at the pay-per-view. A gauntlet match between the six was scheduled for the February 12 episode to determine who would enter the chamber last. Due to a legitimate injury, however, Ali was pulled from the match and replaced with The New Day's Kofi Kingston. Orton won the ensuing gauntlet match, making him the last entrant in the chamber.

On the February 4 episode of  Raw, Raw Women's Champion Ronda Rousey issued an open challenge for the title. The Riott Squad (Ruby Riott, Liv Morgan, and Sarah Logan) came out and Morgan accepted the challenge, but was defeated. Immediately after, Logan stepped up, but was also defeated. Riott did not attempt to challenge Rousey and instead retreated with her Squad. In a backstage interview, Riott stated that she was ensuring that her teammates were okay and claimed that she could defeat Rousey at any time. Later, it was revealed that Rousey would defend her championship against Riott at Elimination Chamber.

On the January 28 episode of Raw, while Finn Bálor was addressing his loss to Universal Champion Brock Lesnar at the Royal Rumble, he was interrupted by Intercontinental Champion Bobby Lashley and his manager Lio Rush. Lashley claimed that he was better than Lesnar and then attacked Bálor. The following week, Bálor was scheduled to face Lashley, but Lashley instead had Bálor face Rush. Lashley stated that depending on Bálor's performance, he would consider giving him a title shot, but before the match could begin, Lashley attacked Bálor. Despite this, Bálor defeated Rush. Bálor was then scheduled to face both Lashley and Rush in a handicap match at Elimination Chamber with Lashley's Intercontinental Championship on the line.

During the second half of 2018, Baron Corbin served as the Acting Raw General Manager. During this time, Braun Strowman was on the receiving end of his authority, including Corbin costing Strowman the Universal Championship at Crown Jewel. At TLC: Tables, Ladders & Chairs, Strowman defeated Corbin in the titular match, thus stripping Corbin of his authoritative power and earning another Universal Championship match at the Royal Rumble. However, Corbin also caused Strowman to lose this title opportunity. After a confrontation between the two on the January 14 episode of Raw, Strowman chased Corbin to the backstage area where Corbin hid in what was later revealed to be Vince McMahon's limousine. Strowman destroyed the limo, resulting in Mr. McMahon fining him $100,000 and cancelling his championship match. Strowman and Corbin continued going at each other over the next couple of weeks and a no disqualification match between the two was scheduled for Elimination Chamber.

On the Royal Rumble Kickoff pre-show, Buddy Murphy defeated Kalisto, Akira Tozawa, and Hideo Itami in a fatal four-way match to retain the WWE Cruiserweight Championship. On the February 5, 2019, episode of 205 Live, Tozawa defeated Cedric Alexander, Lio Rush, and Humberto Carrillo in a fatal four-way elimination match to earn another championship match against Murphy on the Elimination Chamber Kickoff pre-show.

Event

Pre-show 
During the Elimination Chamber Kickoff pre-show, Buddy Murphy defended the WWE Cruiserweight Championship against Akira Tozawa. In the climax, Murphy performed "Murphy's Law" on Tozawa to retain the title.

Preliminary matches 
The actual pay-per-view opened with the women's tag team Elimination Chamber match to determine the inaugural WWE Women's Tag Team Champions. The Boss 'n' Hug Connection (Bayley and Sasha Banks) and Mandy Rose and Sonya Deville started first due to a pre-match stipulation. The Riott Squad (represented by Liv Morgan and Sarah Logan) were the third to enter. The fourth to enter were The IIconics (Billie Kay and Peyton Royce), followed by Naomi and Carmella. The IIconics performed an assisted roll-up on Naomi to eliminate Naomi and Carmella. The last to enter were Nia Jax and Tamina, who performed stereo Samoan drops on Kay and Royce to eliminate The IIconics. Tamina performed a "Superfly Splash" on Logan and Morgan to eliminate The Riott Squad. Jax attempted to perform a spear on Bayley, however, Bayley avoided Jax who crashed through a pod, knocking herself out. Bayley then performed a diving elbow drop on Tamina, and she, Banks, Deville, and Rose collectively pinned Tamina to eliminate Nia Jax and Tamina. In the climax, Banks forced Deville to submit to the "Bank Statement", thus The Boss 'n' Hug Connection were crowned the inaugural WWE Women's Tag Team Champions. After the match, both Bayley and Banks cut a promo saying that it was the result of their hard work and determination.

Next, The Miz and Shane McMahon defended the SmackDown Tag Team Championship against The Usos (Jey Uso and Jimmy Uso). In the end, Miz performed a "Skull Crushing Finale" on Jimmy; However, as Miz went for the pin, Jimmy countered with a crucifix to win the title for a record fourth time.

After that, Bobby Lashley defended the Intercontinental Championship in a handicap match in which he teamed with Lio Rush to face Finn Bálor. In the end, Bálor performed a "Coup de Gráce" on Rush to win Lashley's title. After the match, an irate Lashley attacked Rush with a Thrust Spinebuster and walked off.

In the fourth match, Ronda Rousey defended the Raw Women's Championship against Ruby Riott. In the end, Rousey forced Riott to submit to the armbar in 100 seconds. Charlotte Flair, Rousey's WrestleMania 35 opponent who sat at ringside for the match, entered the ring and stared down Rousey until Becky Lynch, Rousey's original WrestleMania opponent who got suspended, emerged from the crowd on crutches. Lynch then attacked Flair with a crutch while Rousey watched. Lynch handed Rousey the other crutch to also attack Flair, but she herself attacked Rousey with a crutch. Security personnel emerged and escorted Lynch out of the building.

In the penultimate match, Braun Strowman faced Baron Corbin in a no disqualification match. Midway through the match, Drew McIntyre came out to assist Corbin, followed by Bobby Lashley. In the climax, Corbin, McIntyre, and Lashley performed a triple powerbomb on Strowman off the steel steps through two tables, allowing Corbin to pin Strowman to win the match.

Main event
In the main event, Daniel Bryan defended the WWE Championship in an Elimination Chamber match against Kofi Kingston, AJ Styles, Jeff Hardy, Randy Orton, and Samoa Joe. Bryan and Joe began the match. Kingston entered third. The fourth entrant was Styles, who eliminated Joe with a "Phenomenal Forearm". Hardy entered fifth but was eliminated by Bryan after a running knee. The last to enter was Orton, who earned that right by winning the gauntlet match on "SmackDown". As Styles attempted a "Phenomenal Forearm" on Kingston, Orton caught Styles with an "RKO" to eliminate Styles. Shortly after, Kingston caught Orton with "Trouble in Paradise" to eliminate Orton, leaving Kingston and Bryan as the final two. After several near-falls, Bryan eliminated Kingston after a running knee to retain the title. Following the match, a disappointed Kingston was joined by his New Day partners Big E and Xavier Woods as the fans cheered to show their appreciation to Kingston.

Aftermath

Raw
The following night on Raw, inaugural WWE Women's Tag Team Champions The Boss 'n' Hug Connection stated that they would be defending the titles across Raw, SmackDown, and NXT. They were then confronted by Nia Jax and Tamina who wanted to be the first challengers. Jax then taunted Banks and stated that whenever Banks wins a title, she loses it in her first defense. The following week, a match pitting Bayley and Banks against Jax and Tamina for the titles was scheduled for Fastlane.

Braun Strowman and Baron Corbin had a rematch in a tables match which Strowman won.

New Intercontinental Champion Finn Bálor addressed his victory. Rush interrupted Bálor and was attacked from behind by previous champion Bobby Lashley. NXT call-up Ricochet came to Bálor's aid and he teamed up with Bálor in his Raw debut match to face Lashley and Rush in which Ricochet pinned Rush to win the match.

Ruby Riott had a rematch with Raw Women's Champion Ronda Rousey. Despite her Riott Squad's (Liv Morgan and Sarah Logan) interference in the match, Riott once again lost.

SmackDown
On the following episode of SmackDown, a six-man tag team match was scheduled pitting WWE Champion Daniel Bryan, Samoa Joe, and Randy Orton against Kofi Kingston, AJ Styles, and Jeff Hardy. Kingston won the match for his team by pinning Bryan. Afterwards, Kingston was granted a WWE Championship match against Bryan at Fastlane. The following week, however, Vince McMahon replaced Kingston with the returning Kevin Owens.

The Miz apologized to Shane McMahon for costing them the SmackDown Tag Team Championship and begged Shane to schedule a rematch, since Shane had to power to do so. After new champions The Usos insulted Miz, Shane scheduled a rematch for Fastlane.

In a backstage segment, SmackDown Women's Champion Asuka was interrupted by Sonya Deville and Mandy Rose. Rose faced Asuka in a non-title match that saw an appearance by Lacey Evans, and Rose won after she feigned an eye injury. The following week, a match between Asuka and Rose for the title was scheduled for Fastlane.

Charlotte Flair addressed Becky Lynch's attack and boasted about reinjuring Lynch's knee at a house show the night before the pay-per-view. Flair then reiterated Triple H's statement from the night before on Raw, saying that Lynch would be arrested the next time she broke her suspension.

205 Live
On the following episode of 205 Live, General Manager Drake Maverick scheduled a tournament to determine WWE Cruiserweight Champion Buddy Murphy's opponent at WrestleMania 35.

The 2019 event would be the only Elimination Chamber to feature the 205 Live brand, as in September, 205 Live merged under NXT.

Results

Inaugural WWE Women's Tag Team Championship Elimination Chamber match

WWE Championship Elimination Chamber match

References

Citations

External links

2019
2019 WWE pay-per-view events
2019 WWE Network events
2019 in Texas
February 2019 events in the United States
Events in Houston
Professional wrestling in Houston